Martin Lidegaard (born 12 December 1966 in Copenhagen) is a Danish politician who since 2022 has been political leader of the Social Liberal Party. He was Denmark's Foreign Minister in the government of Prime Minister Helle Thorning-Schmidt from 2014 to 2015, having previously been the Minister of Climate, Energy and Building from 2011 to 2014.

Political career 
Lidegaard has served as a member of the Folketing from 2001 until 2007 and again since the 2015 elections.

On 3 November, one day after former leader Sofie Carsten Nielsen resigned, Lidegaard became leader of the Social Liberal Party. At the press conference announcing this, he reiterated the Social Liberal Party stance of a government with parties from both blocs.

Other activities
 European Council on Foreign Relations (ECFR), Member of the Council
 Trilateral Commission, Member of the European Group

References

External links
 

|-

1966 births
Government ministers of Denmark
Danish Ministers of Climate and Energy
Foreign ministers of Denmark
Living people
Politicians from Copenhagen
Members of the Folketing 2001–2005
Members of the Folketing 2005–2007
Members of the Folketing 2015–2019
Members of the Folketing 2019–2022
Members of the Folketing 2022–2026
Leaders of political parties in Denmark
Leaders of the Danish Social Liberal Party